Machi Goth (Punjabi and ) is a small city/town in Sadiqabad Tehsil of Rahim Yar Khan District in Punjab province of Pakistan. Fauji Fertilizer Company (FFC) is located in Machi Goth.

Populated places in Rahim Yar Khan District
Rahim Yar Khan District